Dietrich Bürkel (January 2, 1905 – December 25, 1986) was a German politician of the Christian Democratic Union (CDU) and former member of the German Bundestag.

Life 
He was a member of the German Bundestag from 1953 to 1957. He had entered parliament via the state list of the CDU North Rhine-Westphalia.

Literature

References

1905 births
1986 deaths
Members of the Bundestag for North Rhine-Westphalia
Members of the Bundestag 1953–1957
Members of the Bundestag for the Christian Democratic Union of Germany